The Cooper T71 is a Formula 2 car built by Cooper Cars in 1964. A hybrid version, called the T71/73, was a combination between the T71 F2 car, and the Cooper T73 F1 car.

References

Cooper racing cars
Formula Two cars
1960s cars
Cars of England